Hoplolaimidae is a family of plant pathogenic nematodes. It has two subfamilies, Hoplolaiminae and Rotylenchulinae. Typically hoplolaimids are ecto- or semi endoparasites of higher plants.

Subfamilies and genera in Hoplolaimidae

Type subfamily
Hoplolaiminae Filip'ev, 1934.
 Nemonchinae Skarbilovich, 1959
 Rotylenchoidinae Whitehead, 1958
 Aphasmatylenchinae Sher, 1965 (n. syn.)
 Rotylenchinae Golden, 1971 (n. syn.)
 Pararotylenchinae Baldwin & Bell, 1981 (n. syn.)

Genera
 Hoplolaimus von Daday, 1905
 Rotylenchus Filip'ev, 1936
 Helicotylenchus Steiner, 1945
 Scutellonema Andrâssy, 1958
 Aorolaimus Sher, 1963
 Aphasmatylenchus Sher, 1965
 Antarctylus Sher, 1973
 Pararotylenchus Baldwin & Bell, 1981

Other subfamily 
Rotylenchulinae Husain & Khan, 1967
 Acontylinae Fotedar & Handoo, 1978

Genera 
 Rotylenchulus Lindford & Oliveira, 1940
 Acontylus Meagher, 1968
 Senegalonema Germani, Luc & Baldwin, 1983

References 
Fortuner, R., 1987. A reappraisal of Tylenchina (Nemata). 8. The family Hoplolaimidae Filip'ev, 1934 (Tylenchoidea). Revue de Nématologie 10(2): 219-232

External links 
 Nemaplex, University of California - Hoplolaimidae

Tylenchida
Plant pathogenic nematodes
Nematode families